Kyi Hla Han (13 February 1961 – 19 February 2022) was a professional golfer from Myanmar who served as executive chairman of the Asian Tour.

Professional career
Han turned professional in 1980. He recorded his first professional wins in 1983 at the Malaysian Dunlop Masters and the Malaysian PGA Championship. He played on the Asian Tour from its debut season in 1995 until 2004. In 1999 he was the top money winner on the tour and that year he collected his only win in an official money Asian Tour tournament at the Volvo China Open.

In 2006, Han was appointed Chairman of the Asian Tour, upon the tour having been reconstituted in 2004 after having been taken over by the players themselves. He is given credit for having overseen the rapid growth of the Asian Tour.

Death
Han died in Singapore on 19 February 2022, at the age of 61.

Professional wins (12)

Asian Tour wins (1)

Asian Tour playoff record (0–1)

PGA Tour of Australasia wins (1)

Other wins (10)
1983 Malaysian Dunlop Masters, Malaysian PGA Championship
1984 Malaysian Dunlop Masters
1985 Malaysian PGA Championship
1989 Thai PGA Championship
1993 Hong Kong PGA Championship
1994 Hong Kong PGA Championship, Johor Masters (Malaysia)
1997 Rolex Masters (Singapore)
2003 Nations Cup (with Aung Win)

Results in major championships

CUT = missed the half-way cut
Note: Han only played in The Open Championship.

Results in World Golf Championships

Team appearances
World Cup (representing Burma/Myanmar): 1980, 1999, 2002, 2003, 2004

References

Asian Tour golfers
Burmese male golfers
Golf administrators
Sportspeople from Yangon
1961 births
2022 deaths